A Chinese restaurant is a food establishment serving Chinese cuisine. The term can also refer to:
Restaurants in China
Chinese restaurant syndrome, a fallacy purportedly caused by glutamate which occurs naturally in plants, meats and seafood.
Chinese restaurant process (a concept in probability theory)
"The Chinese Restaurant", a second-season episode of Seinfeld
Chinese Restaurant, a reality show presented by HBS, starring Zhao Wei, Huang Xiaoming, Zhou Dongyu
A Cantonese restaurant, popular in Hong Kong and southern China

See also 
American Chinese cuisine
Canadian Chinese cuisine